Juan Carlos García (born January 10, 1974) is a Colombian former professional boxer who competed from 1995 to 2014. He challenged for the IBF light middleweight title in 2003.

Professional career

Candelo last fought in 2014, losing by TKO to Abraham Han. His professional record was 32-14-4, with 24 KOs.

References

External links
 

Living people
1974 births
Colombian male boxers
Light-middleweight boxers
People from Buenaventura, Valle del Cauca
Sportspeople from Valle del Cauca Department